Nadur monji  or nadir monji is a fried snack (fritter) prepared from lotus stem and gram flour. Originating in Kashmir, it is found across South Asia.

Preparation 
The preparation of nadur monji begins with one or two ingredients, such as Lotus root, Rice flour, salt, Red chilli powder, Caraway seeds, Thyme powder, cauliflower, cayenne pepper, chili pepper, or occasionally black cumin. Lotus roots are cut into long pieces and further cut into strips. Mixed with rice flour, salt, red chilli powder, caraway seeds, thyme powder and is heated in a kadai. Fried till crisp and reddish-brown color and served hot with chutney.

Serving 
Nadur monji are usually served as snacks or appetizers. In Kashmir, they are popular as a street food and fast food snack.

References

External links 
 Nadur Monji at Sanjeev Kapoor

Appetizers
Indian snack foods
Kashmiri cuisine
Deep fried foods